Viktor Zaytsev (born June 6, 1966) is a retired javelin thrower from Uzbekistan who competed for the Unified Team at the 1992 Summer Olympics in Barcelona, Spain. He did not reach the final. He won the silver medal two years earlier at the European Championships in Split, Yugoslavia. He was born in Tashkent, Uzbek SSR, Soviet Union.

Achievements

References
 Year Ranking
 Viktor Zaytsev's profile at Sports Reference.com
 Biography of Viktor Zaytsev 

1966 births
Living people
Uzbekistani people of Russian descent
Uzbekistani male javelin throwers
Athletes (track and field) at the 1992 Summer Olympics
Olympic athletes of the Unified Team
Sportspeople from Tashkent
Athletes (track and field) at the 1994 Asian Games
Asian Games medalists in athletics (track and field)
European Athletics Championships medalists
Goodwill Games medalists in athletics
Asian Games bronze medalists for Uzbekistan
Medalists at the 1994 Asian Games
CIS Athletics Championships winners
Competitors at the 1990 Goodwill Games